Eugenio "Geny" Moreno Lopez Jr. (November 4, 1928 – June 28, 1999) was the chairman emeritus of ABS-CBN Corporation from 1997 to 1999. He was known within the Lopez Group of Companies as "Kapitán" (Filipino for "Captain"). His great-grandfather Eugenio J. Lopez (1839–1906) was known as "Kapitán Eugenio" ("Captain Eugenio") during his time.

Early life

He was born as Eugenio Moreno Lopez in 1928 in Iloilo City. His parents were Eugenio Lopez Sr. and Pacita Moreno. He was a nephew of former Philippine Vice President Fernando Lopez. He was educated at San Beda College, the Ateneo de Manila, Virginia Military Institute where he earned a Bachelor of Arts degree, and Harvard University where he earned an MBA from Harvard Business School.

In 1956, he purchased equipment for the radio and television stations of ABS-CBN Corporation, which his father owned. He would later lead ABS-CBN as its president until 1972. His father remained as the chairman and CEO.

Death
Lopez died of cancer on June 28, 1999, in Hillsborough, California, six months before the inauguration of the Millennium Transmitter and the new office building and studio annex of ABS-CBN Broadcasting Center. The office building was named in his memory.

In popular culture
Lopez was portrayed by Christopher de Leon in the 1995 film Eskapo.

References

1928 births
1999 deaths
López family of Iloilo
People from Iloilo City
Filipino prisoners and detainees
Ateneo de Manila University alumni
Harvard Business School alumni
San Beda University alumni
Virginia Military Institute alumni
Burials at the Manila Memorial Park – Sucat
Marcos martial law victims
Visayan people
Chairmen of ABS-CBN
Filipino chairpersons of corporations
ABS-CBN executives
Deaths from cancer in California
Filipino expatriates in the United States